The 55th United States Congress was a meeting of the legislative branch of the United States federal government, composed of the United States Senate and the United States House of Representatives. It met in Washington, D.C., from March 4, 1897, to March 4, 1899, during the first two years of William McKinley's presidency. The apportionment of seats in the House of Representatives was based on the 1890 United States census. Both chambers had a Republican majority.  There was one African-American member, George Henry White, a Republican from the state of North Carolina, and one Kaw member, Charles Curtis, a Republican from Kansas.

Major events

 March 4, 1897: William McKinley became President of the United States.
 February 15, 1898: Spanish–American War: USS Maine exploded in Havana harbor.
 December 10, 1898: Treaty of Paris ended Spanish–American War, .

Major legislation

 July 24, 1897: Dingley tariff, ch. 11, increased trade duties for revenue and protection
 April 20, 1898: Teller Resolution (Cuba), 
 April 25, 1898: United States declaration of war upon Spain (Spanish–American War), 
 June 1, 1898: Erdman Act, 
 June 13, 1898: War Revenue Act of 1898, 
 June 28, 1898: Curtis Act of 1898, authorized the mass dispossession of territory from the Cherokee Nation, Chickasaw Nation, Choctaw Nation, Muscogee Nation, and Seminole Nation and  the divestiture of power from their national governments.
 July 1, 1898: Bankruptcy Act of 1898 (Henderson-Nelson Act), ch. 541, gave companies an option of gaining protection from creditors.
 July 7, 1898: Newlands Resolution, No. 55, authorized the annexation of the Republic of Hawaii
 March 3, 1899: Rivers and Harbors Act of 1899, Ch. 425, § 9,

Treaties ratified 
 February 6, 1899: Treaty of Paris, ending the Spanish–American War.  Guam, The Philippines, and Puerto Rico became possessions of the U.S.

Party summary
The count below identifies party affiliations at the beginning of the first session of this Congress, and includes members from vacancies and newly admitted states, when they were first seated. Changes resulting from subsequent replacements are shown below in the "Changes in membership" section.

Senate

House of Representatives

Leadership

Senate
 President: Garret Hobart (R)
 President pro tempore: William P. Frye (R)
Republican Conference Chairman: William B. Allison
 Democratic Caucus Chairman: Arthur Pue Gorman, until 1898
 David Turpie, afterwards

House of Representatives
 Speaker: Thomas Brackett Reed (R)
 Minority Leader: Joseph W. Bailey
 Republican Conference Chairman: Charles H. Grosvenor
 Republican Campaign Committee Chairman: Joseph W. Babcock
 Democratic Caucus Chairman: James D. Richardson
 Democratic Campaign Committee Chairman: Charles James Faulkner

Members
This list is arranged by chamber, then by state. Senators are listed by class, and representatives are listed by district.
Skip to House of Representatives, below

Senate
Senators were elected by the state legislatures every two years, with one-third beginning new six-year terms with each Congress. Preceding the names in the list below are Senate class numbers, which indicate the cycle of their election. In this Congress, Class 1 meant their term ended with this Congress, requiring re-election in 1898; Class 2 meant their term began in the last Congress, requiring re-election in 1900; and Class 3 meant their term began in this Congress, requiring re-election in 1902.

Alabama 
 2. John T. Morgan (D)
 3. Edmund Pettus (D)

Arkansas 
 2. James H. Berry (D)
 3. James K. Jones (D)

California 
 1. Stephen M. White (D)
 3. George C. Perkins (R)

Colorado 
 2. Edward O. Wolcott (R)
 3. Henry M. Teller (SR)

Connecticut 
 1. Joseph R. Hawley (R)
 3. Orville H. Platt (R)

Delaware 
 1. George Gray (D)
 2. Richard R. Kenney (D)

Florida 
 1. Samuel Pasco (D)
 3. Stephen R. Mallory (D), from May 14, 1897

Georgia 
 2. Augustus O. Bacon (D)
 3. Alexander S. Clay (D)

Idaho 
 2. George L. Shoup (R)
 3. Henry Heitfeld (P)

Illinois 
 2. Shelby M. Cullom (R)
 3. William E. Mason (R)

Indiana 
 1. David Turpie (D)
 3. Charles W. Fairbanks (R)

Iowa 
 2 John H. Gear (R)
 3. William B. Allison (R)

Kansas 
 2. Lucien Baker (R)
 3. William A. Harris (P)

Kentucky 
 2. William Lindsay (D)
 3. William J. Deboe (R)

Louisiana 
 2. Donelson Caffery (D)
 3. Samuel D. McEnery (D)

Maine 
 1. Eugene Hale (R)
 2. William P. Frye (R)

Maryland 
 1. Arthur Pue Gorman (D)
 3. George L. Wellington (R)

Massachusetts 
 1. Henry Cabot Lodge (R)
 2. George F. Hoar (R)

Michigan 
 1. Julius C. Burrows (R)
 2. James McMillan (R)

Minnesota 
 1. Cushman Davis (R)
 2. Knute Nelson (R)

Mississippi 
 1. James Z. George (D), until August 14, 1897
 Hernando D. Money (D), from October 8, 1897
 2. Edward C. Walthall (D), until April 21, 1898
 William V. Sullivan (D), from May 31, 1898

Missouri 
 1. Francis M. Cockrell (D)
 3. George G. Vest (D)

Montana 
 1. Lee Mantle (SR)
 2. Thomas H. Carter (R)

Nebraska 
 1. William V. Allen (P)
 2. John M. Thurston (R)

Nevada 
 1. William M. Stewart (S)
 3. John P. Jones (S)

New Hampshire 
 2. William E. Chandler (R)
 3. Jacob H. Gallinger (R)

New Jersey 
 1. James Smith Jr. (D)
 2. William J. Sewell (R)

New York 
 1. Edward Murphy Jr. (D)
 3. Thomas C. Platt (R)

North Carolina 
 2. Marion Butler (P)
 3. Jeter C. Pritchard (R)

North Dakota 
 1. William N. Roach (D)
 3. Henry C. Hansbrough (R)

Ohio 
 1. John Sherman (R), until March 4, 1897
 Mark Hanna (R), from March 5, 1897
 3. Joseph B. Foraker (R)

Oregon 
 2. George W. McBride (R)
 3. Joseph Simon (R), from October 7, 1898

Pennsylvania 
 1. Matthew S. Quay (R)
 3. Boies Penrose (R)

Rhode Island 
 1. Nelson W. Aldrich (R)
 2. George P. Wetmore (R)

South Carolina 
 2. Benjamin R. Tillman (D)
 3. Joseph H. Earle (D), until May 20, 1897
 John L. McLaurin (D), from June 1, 1897

South Dakota 
 2. Richard F. Pettigrew (SR)
 3. James H. Kyle (P)

Tennessee 
 1. William B. Bate (D)
 2. Isham G. Harris (D), until July 8, 1897
 Thomas B. Turley (D), from July 20, 1897

Texas 
 1. Roger Q. Mills (D)
 2. Horace Chilton (D)

Utah 
 1. Frank J. Cannon (SR)
 3. Joseph L. Rawlins (D)

Vermont 
 1. Redfield Proctor (R)
 3. Justin S. Morrill (R), until December 28, 1898
 Jonathan Ross (R), from January 11, 1899

Virginia 
 1. John W. Daniel (D)
 2. Thomas S. Martin (D)

Washington 
 1. John L. Wilson (R)
 3. George Turner (SR)

West Virginia 
 1. Charles J. Faulkner (D)
 2. Stephen B. Elkins (R)

Wisconsin 
 1. John L. Mitchell (D)
 3. John C. Spooner (R)

Wyoming 
 1. Clarence D. Clark (R)
 2. Francis E. Warren (R)

House of Representatives
The names of members of the House of Representatives are preceded by their district numbers.

Alabama 
 . George W. Taylor (D)
 . Jesse F. Stallings (D)
 . Henry D. Clayton (D)
 . Thomas S. Plowman (D), until February 9, 1898
 William F. Aldrich (R), from February 9, 1898
 . Willis Brewer (D)
 . John H. Bankhead (D)
 . Milford W. Howard (P)
 . Joseph Wheeler (D)
 . Oscar Underwood (D)

Arkansas 
 . Philip D. McCulloch Jr. (D)
 . John S. Little (D)
 . Thomas C. McRae (D)
 . William L. Terry (D)
 . Hugh A. Dinsmore (D)
 . Stephen Brundidge Jr. (D)

California 
 . John A. Barham (R)
 . Marion De Vries (D)
 . Samuel G. Hilborn (R)
 . James G. Maguire (D)
 . Eugene F. Loud (R)
 . Charles A. Barlow (P)
 . Curtis H. Castle (P)

Colorado 
 . John F. Shafroth (SR)
 . John C. Bell (P)

Connecticut 
 . E. Stevens Henry (R)
 . Nehemiah D. Sperry (R)
 . Charles A. Russell (R)
 . Ebenezer J. Hill (R)

Delaware 
 . L. Irving Handy (D)

Florida 
 . Stephen M. Sparkman (D)
 . Robert W. Davis (D)

Georgia 
 . Rufus E. Lester (D)
 . James M. Griggs (D)
 . Elijah B. Lewis (D)
 . William C. Adamson (D)
 . Leonidas F. Livingston (D)
 . Charles L. Bartlett (D)
 . John W. Maddox (D)
 . William M. Howard (D)
 . Farish C. Tate (D)
 . William H. Fleming (D)
 . William G. Brantley (D)

Idaho 
 . James Gunn (P)

Illinois 
 . James R. Mann (R)
 . William Lorimer (R)
 . Hugh R. Belknap (R)
 . Daniel W. Mills (R)
 . George E. White (R)
 . Edward D. Cooke (R), until June 24, 1897
 Henry S. Boutell (R), from November 23, 1897
 . George E. Foss (R)
 . Albert J. Hopkins (R)
 . Robert R. Hitt (R)
 . George W. Prince (R)
 . Walter Reeves (R)
 . Joseph G. Cannon (R)
 . Vespasian Warner (R)
 . Joseph V. Graff (R)
 . Benjamin F. Marsh (R)
 . William H. Hinrichsen (D)
 . James A. Connolly (R)
 . Thomas M. Jett (D)
 . Andrew J. Hunter (D)
 . James R. Campbell (D)
 . Jehu Baker (D)
 . George Washington Smith (R)

Indiana 
 . James A. Hemenway (R)
 . Robert W. Miers (D)
 . William T. Zenor (D)
 . William S. Holman (D), until April 22, 1897
 Francis M. Griffith (D), from December 6, 1897
 . George W. Faris (R)
 . Henry U. Johnson (R)
 . Jesse Overstreet (R)
 . Charles L. Henry (R)
 . Charles B. Landis (R)
 . Edgar D. Crumpacker (R)
 . George W. Steele (R)
 . James M. Robinson (D)
 . Lemuel W. Royse (R)

Iowa 
 . Samuel M. Clark (R)
 . George M. Curtis (R)
 . David B. Henderson (R)
 . Thomas Updegraff (R)
 . Robert G. Cousins (R)
 . John F. Lacey (R)
 . John A. T. Hull (R)
 . William P. Hepburn (R)
 . Alva L. Hager (R)
 . Jonathan P. Dolliver (R)
 . George D. Perkins (R)

Kansas 
 . Case Broderick (R)
 . Mason S. Peters (P)
 . Edwin R. Ridgely (P)
 . Charles Curtis (R)
 . William D. Vincent (P)
 . Nelson B. McCormick (P)
 . Jeremiah Simpson (P)
 . Jeremiah D. Botkin (P)

Kentucky 
 . Charles K. Wheeler (D)
 . John D. Clardy (D)
 . John S. Rhea (D)
 . David Highbaugh Smith (D)
 . Walter Evans (R)
 . Albert S. Berry (D)
 . Evan E. Settle (D)
 . George M. Davison (R)
 . Samuel J. Pugh (R)
 . Thomas Y. Fitzpatrick (D)
 . David G. Colson (R)

Louisiana 
 . Adolph Meyer (D)
 . Robert C. Davey (D)
 . Robert F. Broussard (D)
 . Henry W. Ogden (D)
 . Samuel T. Baird (D)
 . Samuel M. Robertson (D)

Maine 
 . Thomas B. Reed (R)
 . Nelson Dingley Jr. (R), until January 13, 1899
 . Seth L. Milliken (R), until April 18, 1897
 Edwin C. Burleigh (R), from June 21, 1897
 . Charles A. Boutelle (R)

Maryland 
 . Isaac A. Barber (R)
 . William B. Baker (R)
 . William S. Booze (R)
 . William W. McIntire (R)
 . Sydney E. Mudd (R)
 . John McDonald (R)

Massachusetts 
 . Ashley B. Wright (R), until August 14, 1897
 George P. Lawrence (R), from November 2, 1897
 . Frederick H. Gillett (R)
 . Joseph H. Walker (R)
 . George W. Weymouth (R)
 . William S. Knox (R)
 . William H. Moody (R)
 . William E. Barrett (R)
 . Samuel W. McCall (R)
 . John F. Fitzgerald (D)
 . Samuel J. Barrows (R)
 . Charles F. Sprague (R)
 . William C. Lovering (R)
 . John Simpkins (R), until March 27, 1898
 William S. Greene (R), from May 31, 1898

Michigan 
 . John B. Corliss (R)
 . George Spalding (R)
 . Albert M. Todd (D)
 . Edward L. Hamilton (R)
 . William Alden Smith (R)
 . Samuel W. Smith (R)
 . Horace G. Snover (R)
 . Ferdinand Brucker (D)
 . Roswell P. Bishop (R)
 . Rousseau O. Crump (R)
 . William S. Mesick (R)
 . Carlos D. Shelden (R)

Minnesota 
 . James Albertus Tawney (R)
 . James T. McCleary (R)
 . Joel Heatwole (R)
 . Frederick C. Stevens (R)
 . Loren Fletcher (R)
 . R. Page W. Morris (R)
 . Frank Eddy (R)

Mississippi 
 . John M. Allen (D)
 . William V. Sullivan (D), until May 31, 1898
 Thomas Spight (D), from July 5, 1898
 . Thomas C. Catchings (D)
 . Andrew F. Fox (D)
 . John Sharp Williams (D)
 . William F. Love (D), until October 16, 1898
 Frank A. McLain (D), from December 12, 1898
 . Patrick Henry (D)

Missouri 
 . James T. Lloyd (D), from June 1, 1897
 . Robert N. Bodine (D)
 . Alexander M. Dockery (D)
 . Charles F. Cochran (D)
 . William S. Cowherd (D)
 . David A. De Armond (D)
 . James Cooney (D)
 . Richard P. Bland (D)
 . James Beauchamp Clark (D)
 . Richard Bartholdt (R)
 . Charles F. Joy (R)
 . Charles E. Pearce (R)
 . Edward Robb (D)
 . Willard D. Vandiver (D)
 . Maecenas E. Benton (D)

Montana 
 . Charles S. Hartman (SR)

Nebraska 
 . Jesse B. Strode (R)
 . David H. Mercer (R)
 . Samuel Maxwell (P)
 . William L. Stark (P)
 . Roderick D. Sutherland (P)
 . William L. Greene (P)

Nevada 
 . Francis G. Newlands (S)

New Hampshire 
 . Cyrus A. Sulloway (R)
 . Frank G. Clarke (R)

New Jersey 
 . Henry C. Loudenslager (R)
 . John J. Gardner (R)
 . Benjamin F. Howell (R)
 . Mahlon Pitney (R), until January 10, 1899
 . James F. Stewart (R)
 . Richard Wayne Parker (R)
 . Thomas McEwan Jr. (R)
 . Charles N. Fowler (R)

New York 
 . Joseph M. Belford (R)
 . Denis M. Hurley (R), until February 26, 1899
 . Francis H. Wilson (R), until September 30, 1897
 Edmund H. Driggs (D), from December 6, 1897
 . Israel F. Fischer (R)
 . Charles G. Bennett (R)
 . James R. Howe (R)
 . John H. G. Vehslage (D)
 . John M. Mitchell (R)
 . Thomas J. Bradley (D)
 . Amos J. Cummings (D)
 . William Sulzer (D)
 . George B. McClellan Jr. (D)
 . Richard C. Shannon (R)
 . Lemuel E. Quigg (R)
 . Philip B. Low (R)
 . William L. Ward (R)
 . Benjamin Odell (R)
 . John H. Ketcham (R)
 . Aaron V. S. Cochrane (R)
 . George N. Southwick (R)
 . David F. Wilber (R)
 . Lucius N. Littauer (R)
 . Wallace T. Foote Jr. (R)
 . Charles A. Chickering (R)
 . James S. Sherman (R)
 . George W. Ray (R)
 . James J. Belden (R)
 . Sereno E. Payne (R)
 . Charles W. Gillet (R)
 . James W. Wadsworth (R)
 . Henry C. Brewster (R)
 . Rowland B. Mahany (R)
 . De Alva S. Alexander (R)
 . Warren B. Hooker (R), until November 10, 1898

North Carolina 
 . Harry Skinner (P)
 . George H. White (R)
 . John E. Fowler (P)
 . William F. Strowd (P)
 . William W. Kitchin (D)
 . Charles H. Martin (P)
 . Alonzo C. Shuford (P)
 . Romulus Z. Linney (R)
 . Richmond Pearson (R)

North Dakota 
 . Martin N. Johnson (R)

Ohio 
 . William B. Shattuc (R)
 . Jacob H. Bromwell (R)
 . John L. Brenner (D)
 . George A. Marshall (D)
 . David Meekison (D)
 . Seth W. Brown (R)
 . Walter L. Weaver (R)
 . Archibald Lybrand (R)
 . James H. Southard (R)
 . Lucien J. Fenton (R)
 . Charles H. Grosvenor (R)
 . John J. Lentz (D)
 . James A. Norton (D)
 . Winfield S. Kerr (R)
 . Henry C. Van Voorhis (R)
 . Lorenzo Danford (R)
 . John A. McDowell (D)
 . Robert W. Tayler (R)
 . Stephen A. Northway (R), until September 8, 1898
 Charles W. F. Dick (R), from November 8, 1898
 . Clifton B. Beach (R)
 . Theodore E. Burton (R)

Oregon 
 . Thomas H. Tongue (R)
 . William R. Ellis (R)

Pennsylvania 
 . Henry H. Bingham (R)
 . Robert Adams Jr. (R)
 . William McAleer (D)
 . James R. Young (R)
 . Alfred C. Harmer (R)
 . Thomas S. Butler (IR)
 . Irving P. Wanger (R)
 . William S. Kirkpatrick (R)
 . Daniel Ermentrout (D)
 . Marriott Brosius (R)
 . William Connell (R)
 . Morgan B. Williams (R)
 . Charles N. Brumm (R)
 . Marlin E. Olmsted (R)
 . James H. Codding (R)
 . Horace B. Packer (R)
 . Monroe H. Kulp (R)
 . Thaddeus M. Mahon (R)
 . George J. Benner (D)
 . Josiah D. Hicks (R)
 . Edward E. Robbins (R)
 . John Dalzell (R)
 . William A. Stone (R), until November 9, 1898
 William H. Graham (R), from November 29, 1898
 . Ernest F. Acheson (R)
 . Joseph B. Showalter (R), from April 20, 1897
 . John C. Sturtevant (R)
 . Charles W. Stone (R)
 . William C. Arnold (R)
 . Samuel A. Davenport (R)
 . Galusha A. Grow (R)

Rhode Island 
 . Melville Bull (R)
 . Adin B. Capron (R)

South Carolina 
 . William Elliott (D)
 . William J. Talbert (D)
 . Asbury C. Latimer (D)
 . Stanyarne Wilson (D)
 . Thomas J. Strait (D)
 . John L. McLaurin (D), until May 31, 1897
 James Norton (D), from December 6, 1897
 . J. William Stokes (D)

South Dakota 
Both representatives were elected statewide on a general ticket.
 . John E. Kelley (P)
 . Freeman Knowles (P)

Tennessee 
 . Walter P. Brownlow (R)
 . Henry R. Gibson (R)
 . John A. Moon (D)
 . Benton McMillin (D), until January 6, 1899
 . James D. Richardson (D)
 . John W. Gaines (D)
 . Nicholas N. Cox (D)
 . Thetus W. Sims (D)
 . Rice A. Pierce (D)
 . Edward W. Carmack (D)

Texas 
 . Thomas H. Ball (D)
 . Samuel B. Cooper (D)
 . Reese C. De Graffenreid (D)
 . John W. Cranford (D), until March 3, 1899
 . Joseph W. Bailey (D)
 . Robert E. Burke (D)
 . Robert L. Henry (D)
 . Samuel W. T. Lanham (D)
 . Joseph D. Sayers (D), until January 16, 1899
 . Robert B. Hawley (R)
 . Rudolph Kleberg (D)
 . James L. Slayden (D)
 . John H. Stephens (D)

Utah 
 . William H. King (D)

Vermont 
 . H. Henry Powers (R)
 . William W. Grout (R)

Virginia 
 . William A. Jones (D)
 . William A. Young (D), until April 26, 1898
 Richard A. Wise (R), from April 26, 1898
 . John Lamb (D)
 . Sydney P. Epes (D), until March 23, 1898
 Robert T. Thorp (R), from March 23, 1898
 . Claude A. Swanson (D)
 . Peter J. Otey (D)
 . James Hay (D)
 . John F. Rixey (D)
 . James A. Walker (R)
 . Jacob Yost (R)

Washington 
Both representatives were elected statewide on a general ticket.
 . William C. Jones (SR)
 . James Hamilton Lewis (D)

West Virginia 
 . Blackburn B. Dovener (R)
 . Alston G. Dayton (R)
 . Charles P. Dorr (R)
 . Warren Miller (R)

Wisconsin 
 . Henry Allen Cooper (R)
 . Edward Sauerhering (R)
 . Joseph W. Babcock (R)
 . Theobald Otjen (R)
 . Samuel S. Barney (R)
 . James H. Davidson (R)
 . Michael Griffin (R)
 . Edward S. Minor (R)
 . Alexander Stewart (R)
 . John J. Jenkins (R)

Wyoming 
 . John E. Osborne (D)

Non-voting members
 . Marcus A. Smith (D)
 . Harvey B. Fergusson (D)
 . James Y. Callahan (S)

Changes in membership
The count below reflects changes from the beginning of the first session of this Congress.

Senate 
 Replacements: 5
 Democratic: no net change
 Republican: no net change
 Deaths: 5
 Resignations: 0
Total seats with changes: 8

House of Representatives 
 Replacements: 14
 Democratic: 1 seat net loss
 Republican: 1 seat net gain
 Deaths: 10
 Resignations: 9
 Contested election: 3
Total seats with changes: 23

Committees

Senate

 Additional Accommodations for the Library of Congress (Select) (Chairman: George Gray; Ranking Member: Shelby M. Cullom)
 Agriculture and Forestry (Chairman: Redfield Proctor; Ranking Member: James Z. George)
 Appropriations (Chairman: William B. Allison; Ranking Member: Francis M. Cockrell)
 Audit and Control the Contingent Expenses of the Senate (Chairman: John P. Jones; Ranking Member: James K. Jones)
 Canadian Relations (Chairman: John C. Spooner; Ranking Member: Edward Murphy Jr.)
 Census (Chairman: Thomas H. Carter; Ranking Member: David Turpie)
 Civil Service and Retrenchment (Chairman: Jeter C. Pritchard; Ranking Member: Edward C. Walthall)
 Claims (Chairman: Henry M. Teller; Ranking Member: Samuel Pasco)
 Coast Defenses (Chairman: George W. McBride; Ranking Member: Roger Q. Mills)
 Commerce (Chairman: William P. Frye; Ranking Member: George G. Vest)
 Corporations Organized in the District of Columbia (Chairman: John W. Daniel)
 Distributing Public Revenue Among the States (Select)
 District of Columbia (Chairman: James McMillan; Ranking Member: Isham G. Harris then Charles J. Faulkner)
 Education and Labor (Chairman: James H. Kyle; Ranking Member: James Z. George)
 Engrossed Bills (Chairman: Francis M. Cockrell; Ranking Member: Lucien Baker)
 Enrolled Bills (Chairman: William J. Sewell; Ranking Member: Donelson Caffery)
 Establish a University in the United States (Select) (Chairman: George L. Wellington)
 Examine the Several Branches in the Civil Service (Chairman: Joseph B. Foraker)
 Finance (Chairman: Justin S. Morrill; Ranking Member: Isham G. Harris)
 Fisheries (Chairman: George C. Perkins; Ranking Member: John L. Mitchell)
 Five Civilized Tribes of Indians (Select) (Chairman: Samuel Pasco; Ranking Member: Orville H. Platt)
 Foreign Relations (Chairman: Cushman K. Davis; Ranking Member: John T. Morgan) 
 Forest Reservations and the Protection of Game (Chairman: William V. Allen; Ranking Member: John T. Morgan)
 Geological Survey (Select) (Chairman: Stephen B. Elkins; Ranking Member: Edward C. Walthall)
 Immigration (Chairman: Charles W. Fairbanks; Ranking Member: Charles J. Faulkner)
 Indian Affairs (Chairman: Richard F. Pettigrew; Ranking Member: James K. Jones)
 Indian Depredations (Chairman: John L. Wilson; Ranking Member: William Lindsay)
 International Expositions (Select) (Chairman: John M. Thurston; Ranking Member: George G. Vest)
 Interstate Commerce (Chairman: Shelby M. Cullom; Ranking Member: Arthur P. Gorman)
 Irrigation and Reclamation of Arid Lands (Chairman: Francis E. Warren; Ranking Member: Stephen M. White)
 Judiciary (Chairman: George F. Hoar; Ranking Member: James Z. George) 
 Library (Chairman: George P. Wetmore; Ranking Member: Francis M. Cockrell)
 Manufactures (Chairman: William E. Mason; Ranking Member: James Smith Jr.)
 Military Affairs (Chairman: Joseph R. Hawley; Ranking Member: William B. Bate)
 Mines and Mining (Chairman: William M. Stewart; Ranking Member: Roger Q. Mills)
 Mississippi River and its Tributaries (Select)
 National Banks (Select) (Chairman: Lee Mantle; Ranking Member: John L. Mitchell)
 Naval Affairs (Chairman: Eugene Hale; Ranking Member: James Smith Jr.)
 Nicaragua Canal (Select) (Chairman: John Tyler Morgan; Ranking Member: Joseph R. Hawley)
 Omaha Exposition (Select)
 Pacific Railroads (Chairman: John H. Gear; Ranking Member: John T. Morgan)
 Patents (Chairman: Orville H. Platt; Ranking Member: Roger Q. Mills)
 Pensions (Chairman: Jacob H. Gallinger; Ranking Member: John L. Mitchell)
 Post Office and Post Roads (Chairman: Edward O. Wolcott; Ranking Member: Marion Butler)
 Potomac River Front (Select) (Chairman: David Turpie; Ranking Member: William P. Frye)
 Printing (Chairman: Henry Cabot Lodge; Ranking Member: Arthur P. Gorman)
 Private Land Claims (Chairman: James K. Jones; Ranking Member: Eugene Hale)
 Privileges and Elections (Chairman: William E. Chandler; Ranking Member: Charles J. Faulkner)
 Public Buildings and Grounds (Chairman: Matthew S. Quay; Ranking Member: George G. Vest)
 Public Health and National Quarantine (Chairman: George G. Vest; Ranking Member: Samuel D. McEnery)
 Public Lands (Chairman: Henry C. Hansbrough; Ranking Member: James H. Berry)
 Railroads (Chairman: Clarence D. Clark; Ranking Member: William J. Deboe)
 Revision of the Laws (Chairman: Julius C. Burrows; Ranking Member: John W. Daniel)
 Revolutionary Claims (Chairman: Edward C. Walthall; Ranking Member: William B. Bate)
 Rules (Chairman: Nelson W. Aldrich; Ranking Member: Isham G. Harris)
 Tariff Regulation (Select)
 Territories (Chairman: George L. Shoup; Ranking Member: Thomas C. Platt)
 Transportation and Sale of Meat Products (Select) (Chairman: William B. Bate; Ranking Member: Edward O. Wolcott)
 Transportation Routes to the Seaboard (Chairman: George L. Shoup; Ranking Member: James Z. George)
 Trespassers upon Indian Lands (Chairman: Lucien Baker; Ranking Member: William N. Roach)
 Washington City Centennial (Select)
 Whole
 Woman Suffrage (Select) (Chairman: James H. Berry; Ranking Member: Matthew S. Quay)

House of Representatives

 Accounts (Chairman: Benjamin B. Odell Jr.; Ranking Member: Charles L. Bartlett)
 Agriculture (Chairman: James W. Wadsworth; Ranking Member: John S. Williams)
 Alcoholic Liquor Traffic (Chairman: Henry C. Brewster; Ranking Member: John E. Osborne)
 Appropriations (Chairman: Joseph G. Cannon; Ranking Member: Joseph D. Sayers)
 Banking and Currency (Chairman: Joseph H. Walker; Ranking Member: Nicholas N. Cox)
 Claims (Chairman: Charles N. Brumm; Ranking Member: John E. Osborne)
 Coinage, Weights and Measures (Chairman: Charles W. Stone; Ranking Member: Richard P. Bland)
 Disposition of Executive Papers
 District of Columbia (Chairman: Joseph W. Babcock; Ranking Member: James D. Richardson)
 Education (Chairman: Galusha A. Grow; Ranking Member: John E. Fowler)
 Election of the President, Vice President and Representatives in Congress (Chairman: John B. Corliss; Ranking Member: Milford W. Howard)
 Elections No.#1 (Chairman: Robert W. Tayler; Ranking Member: Charles L. Bartlett)
 Elections No.#2 (Chairman: Henry U. Johnson; Ranking Member: James G. Maguire)
 Elections No.#3 (Chairman: James A. Walker; Ranking Member: Robert W. Miers)
 Enrolled Bills (Chairman: Alva L. Hager; Ranking Member: Asbury C. Latimer)
 Expenditures in the Agriculture Department (Chairman: Charles W. Gillet; Ranking Member: William F. Strowd)
 Expenditures in the Interior Department (Chairman: Charles Curtis; Ranking Member: Jehu Baker)
 Expenditures in the Justice Department (Chairman: Cyrus A. Sulloway; Ranking Member: Thomas C. Catchings)
 Expenditures in the Navy Department (Chairman: James F. Stewart; Ranking Member: Stanyarne Wilson)
 Expenditures in the Post Office Department (Chairman: Irving P. Wanger; Ranking Member: Milford W. Howard)
 Expenditures in the State Department (Chairman: Lemuel E. Quigg; Ranking Member: Rufus E. Lester)
 Expenditures in the Treasury Department (Chairman: Robert G. Cousins; Ranking Member: William L. Terry)
 Expenditures in the War Department (Chairman: William W. Grout; Ranking Member: Joseph Wheeler)
 Expenditures on Public Buildings (Chairman: David G. Colson; Ranking Member: Richard P. Bland)
 Foreign Affairs (Chairman: Robert R. Hitt; Ranking Member: Hugh A. Dinsmore)
 Immigration and Naturalization (Chairman: Lorenzo Danford; Ranking Member: John M. Allen)
 Indian Affairs (Chairman: James S. Sherman; Ranking Member: John S. Little)
 Interstate and Foreign Commerce (Chairman: William P. Hepburn; Ranking Member: William McAleer)
 Invalid Pensions (Chairman: George W. Ray; Ranking Member: George B. McClellan)
 Irrigation of Arid Lands (Chairman: William R. Ellis; Ranking Member: John F. Shafroth)
 Judiciary (Chairman: David B. Henderson; Ranking Member: William L. Terry) 
 Labor (Chairman: John J. Gardner; Ranking Member: W. Jasper Talbert) 
 Levees and Improvements of the Mississippi River (Chairman: Richard Bartholdt; Ranking Member: John M. Allen)
 Manufactures (Chairman: George W. Faris; Ranking Member: Willard D. Vandiver)
 Merchant Marine and Fisheries (Chairman: Sereno E. Payne; Ranking Member: John F. Fitzgerald)
 Mileage (Chairman: John A. Barham; Ranking Member: Samuel B. Cooper)
 Military Affairs (Chairman: John A.T. Hull; Ranking Member: William Sulzer)
 Militia (Chairman: Benjamin F. Marsh; Ranking Member: Rudolph Kleberg)
 Mines and Mining (Chairman: Charles H. Grosvenor; Ranking Member: Charles S. Hartman)
 Naval Affairs (Chairman: Charles A. Boutelle; Ranking Member: Amos J. Cummings)
 Pacific Railroads (Chairman: H. Henry Powers; Ranking Member: James G. Maguire)
 Patents (Chairman: Josiah D. Hicks; Ranking Member: William Sulzer)
 Pensions (Chairman: Henry C. Loudenslager; Ranking Member: Jesse F. Stallings)
 Post Office and Post Roads (Chairman: Eugene F. Loud; Ranking Member: Claude A. Swanson)
 Public Buildings and Grounds (Chairman: David H. Mercer; Ranking Member: John H. Bankhead)
 Public Lands (Chairman: John F. Lacey; Ranking Member: John F. Shafroth)
 Railways and Canals (Chairman: Charles A. Chickering; Ranking Member: Peter J. Otey)
 Reform in the Civil Service (Chairman: Marriott Brosius; Ranking Member: Alexander M. Dockery)
 Revision of Laws (Chairman: Vespasian Warner; Ranking Member: John W. Maddox) 
 Rivers and Harbors (Chairman: Warren B. Hooker; Ranking Member: Thomas C. Catchings)
 Rules (Chairman: Thomas B. Reed; Ranking Member: Joseph W. Bailey)
 Standards of Official Conduct
 Territories (Chairman: William S. Knox; Ranking Member: William McAleer)
 Ventilation and Acoustics (Chairman: Joel P. Heatwole; Ranking Member: Harry Skinner)
 War Claims (Chairman: Thaddeus M. Mahon; Ranking Member: George M. Davison)
 Ways and Means (Chairman: Nelson Dingley; Ranking Member: Joseph W. Bailey)
 Whole

Joint committees

 Alcohol in the Arts (Select)
 Conditions of Indian Tribes (Special)
 Disposition of (Useless) Executive Papers
 Enrolled Bills (Chairman: Rep. Alva L. Hager; Vice Chairman: Sen. Asbury C. Latimer)
 Investigate Charities and Reformatory Institutions in the District of Columbia
 The Library (Chairman: Rep. Alfred C. Harmer; Vice Chairman: Rep. Amos J. Cummings)
 Printing (Chairman: Rep. George D. Perkins; Vice Chairman: Rep. James D. Richardson)

Caucuses
 Democratic (House)
 Democratic (Senate)

Employees

Legislative branch agency directors
 Architect of the Capitol: Edward Clark
 Librarian of Congress: Ainsworth Rand Spofford, until 1897 
 John Russell Young, from 1897
 Public Printer of the United States: Thomas E. Benedict, until 1897 
 Francis W. Palmer, from 1897

Senate 
 Secretary: William Ruffin Cox 
 Sergeant at Arms: Richard J. Bright 
 Librarian: Alonzo M. Church
 Chaplain: William H. Millburn Methodist

House of Representatives 
 Clerk: Alexander McDowell
 Sergeant at Arms: Benjamin F. Russell 
 Doorkeeper: William J. Glenn
 Postmaster: Joseph C. McElroy
 Clerk at the Speaker's Table: Asher C. Hinds
 Reading Clerks: E.L. Sampson (D) and Dennis E. Alward (R)
 Chaplain: Henry N. Couden Universalist

See also 
 1896 United States elections (elections leading to this Congress)
 1896 United States presidential election
 1896–97 United States Senate elections
 1896 United States House of Representatives elections
 1898 United States elections (elections during this Congress, leading to the next Congress)
 1898–99 United States Senate elections
 1898 United States House of Representatives elections

References

External links
 Biographical Directory of the U.S. Congress
 U.S. House of Representatives: House History
 U.S. Senate: Statistics and Lists